A locative adverb is a type of adverb that refers to a location or to a combination of a location and a relation to that location. Generally, a locative adverb is semantically equivalent to a prepositional phrase involving a locative or directional preposition. In English, for example, homeward is a locative adverb, specifying a location "home" and a relation "toward" (in this case a direction), and is equivalent to the phrase "toward home". The relation need not be a direction, as it can be any relation that can be specified by a locational preposition such as to, from, in, at, near, toward, or away from. For example, the word home is itself a locative adverb in a sentence like "I took him home today" or "I found him home today"; in the former case, it is equivalent to the phrase "to home", and in the latter to the phrase "at home".

Pro-form locative adverbs generally form a closed class and are particularly important in a language. Examples in English include there (meaning "at that place"), whither (= "to what place"), and hence (= "from this place"). As can be seen from the examples below, these anaphoric locative adverbs generally have a close relationship with the demonstratives (in English, this and that). They are also usually closely related to locative interrogative adverbs; in English, there is (or, at least, once was) a formal relationship between "where/there/here", "whither/thither/hither", and "whence/thence/hence".

See also
 A fuller table is in the article on pro-forms.

References

Adverbs by type